Dewayne Jefferson (born August 10, 1979) is an American former professional basketball player who grew up in West Point, Mississippi.

College career
Jefferson rose to prominence while playing college basketball at Mississippi Valley State University from 1999 to 2001, where he was NCAA Division I's second leading scorer with 23.6 points per game in his senior season.

Professional career
After college, he played professionally in Europe. He last played with Étendard de Brest in France.

Awards and achievements 
 Turkish League Top Scorer (2003)
  West Point High School Slam Dunk Runner-Up, second to Brandon Walker (1997)

See also
List of NCAA Division I men's basketball season 3-point field goal leaders

References

1979 births
Living people
African-American basketball players
American expatriate basketball people in Bosnia and Herzegovina
American expatriate basketball people in France
American expatriate basketball people in Greece
American expatriate basketball people in Italy
American expatriate basketball people in Russia
American expatriate basketball people in Turkey
American men's basketball players
Andrea Costa Imola players
Basketball players from Mississippi
BC Dynamo Moscow players
East Mississippi Community College alumni
Élan Chalon players
Erdemirspor players
Junior college men's basketball players in the United States
Karşıyaka basketball players
KK Bosna Royal players
Makedonikos B.C. players
Mississippi Valley State Delta Devils basketball players
Olympias Patras B.C. players
People from West Point, Mississippi
Roseto Sharks players
Shooting guards
21st-century African-American sportspeople
20th-century African-American sportspeople